Nevzine dessert (Turkish: "Nevzine tatlısı") is a Turkish dessert made with tahini, pekmez and walnut. It is a regional specialty of Kayseri province. It is usually served on Ramadan and on holidays.

Preparation
Nevzine tatlısı is made with a leavened dough made of flour, egg, vegetable oil, tahini, milk and a little vinegar to activate the baking soda which acts as a leavening agent. After kneading the dough, crushed walnuts are incorporated before the dough is kneaded a second time. It is baked in the oven on an ungreased tray and optionally garnished with walnuts. To make the molasses syrup a grape molasses called pekmez is heated on the stove with sugar to make a syrup called şerbet. The warm şerbet is poured over the dessert while hot. It takes several hours for the dessert to cool before it is ready to serve.

See also
 List of desserts

References

 
Middle Eastern cuisine
Turkish desserts